Martin Tupper may refer to:
 Martin Farquhar Tupper, English writer and poet
 Martin Tupper (physician), English physician

See also
 Henry Martin Tupper, American Baptist minister who founded Shaw University